The 27th Pennsylvania House of Representatives District is in southwestern Pennsylvania and has been represented by Dan Deasy since 2009.

District profile 
The 27th Pennsylvania House of Representatives District is located in Allegheny County and includes the following areas:

 Crafton
 Green Tree
Heidelberg
 Ingram
 Pittsburgh (part)
 Ward 19 (part)
Division 01 
Division 02 
Division 03 
Division 04 
Division 05 
Division 06 
Division 07 
Division 08 
Division 09 
Division 10 
Division 13 
Division 28
 Ward 20
Division 01 
Division 02 
Division 03 
Division 04
Division 05 
Division 06 
Division 07 
Division 14 
Division 15 
Division 16 
Division 17 
Division 18
 Ward 28
Rosslyn Farms
Scott Towsnhip
 Thornburg

Representatives

Recent election results

References

External links 
District map from the United States Census Bureau

Pennsylvania House Legislative District Maps from the Pennsylvania Redistricting Commission.

Population Data for District 27 from the Pennsylvania Redistricting Commission.

Government of Allegheny County, Pennsylvania
27